Lelia Tony Corona Masaga (born 30 August 1986) is a New Zealand international rugby union player. He plays for Glasgow Warriors. Masaga plays on Wing.

Rugby Union career

Amateur career

Masaga was drafted to Marr in the Scottish Premiership for the 2017–18 season.

Masaga has been drafted to Glasgow Hawks in the Scottish Premiership for the 2018–19 season.

Professional career

Masaga played for the Chiefs in New Zealand.

After the 2013 Super Rugby season, he moved to play rugby in Japan.

On 12 May 2017 Glasgow Warriors confirmed a 2-year signing of Masaga beginning for the 2017-18 season.

Masaga played his first match for the Warriors on 25 August 2017 coming on as a substitute against Dragons in a 40–23 away win.

International career

Masaga was selected for the New Zealand U21 side for the 2006 Under 21 Rugby World Cup in France. Masaga was the top try scorer in the tournament with 7 tries.

The NZRU's controversial decision to 'recondition' established All Black test players including Chiefs anchors Sitiveni Sivivatu and Mils Muliaina allowed Masaga to cement his position in the side. Despite early losses in the 2007 season, coaches Ian Foster and Warren Gatland showed patience and trust in the young winger who has performed remarkably well, co-leading the tournament as top try scorer with 8 tries going into the last round. He was included in the All Blacks squad for the 2009 Iveco Series to cover for injuries when he earned his first test cap against Italy on 27 June 2009.

References

External links

Chiefs web site profile 
Under 21 selection
2006 IRB Under 21 top tryscorer list
Masaga discusses the early stages of Super 14 2007 for the Chiefs
Masaga's is interviewed about his excellent effort in a crucial win against the Sharks in April 2007 
BOP profile

1986 births
Bay of Plenty rugby union players
Living people
New Zealand international rugby union players
New Zealand rugby union players
Chiefs (rugby union) players
Counties Manukau rugby union players
Mie Honda Heat players
Rugby union wings
Rugby union players from Wellington City
New Zealand expatriate rugby union players
Expatriate rugby union players in Japan
New Zealand expatriate sportspeople in Japan
People educated at James Cook High School
Glasgow Warriors players
Marr RFC players
Glasgow Hawks players
Expatriate rugby union players in Scotland
New Zealand expatriate sportspeople in Scotland